Herman Orville Welker (December 11, 1906 – October 30, 1957) was an American politician from the state of Idaho. He was a member of the Idaho Republican Party and served one term in the United States Senate, from 1951 to 1957.

Early years
Born in Cambridge, Idaho, Welker was the youngest of seven children of John Thornton and Anna Zella Shepherd Welker, who had moved from North Carolina and started a potato farm. He was the grandson of Rev. George W. Welker of North Carolina. He attended grade school in Cambridge and high school in Weiser. After graduation from Weiser High School in 1924, Welker went north to Moscow to attend the University of Idaho, where he started off in a general studies program and was a member of the Sigma Chi fraternity. He switched to the College of Law in 1926 and graduated with an LL.B. degree in 1929.

Legal career
Welker passed the bar at age 21 and was elected as the prosecuting attorney for Washington County before he graduated. He was re-elected and served in that position from 1928 to 1936. Welker moved to Los Angeles in 1936 and had a private practice until 1943, when he enlisted in the U.S. Army Air Forces and served until 1944. He returned to Idaho and practiced law at Payette until 1950 and was a member of the state senate from 1949 to 1951.

U.S. Senate
In Idaho in 1950, Welker ran for the U.S. Senate, as both seats were up for election that year. He won August's Republican primary over Congressman John Sanborn and Governor C. A. Robins, then defeated former Democratic Senator D. Worth Clark in the general election. Welker gained seats on several important committees, including the Armed Services and Judiciary committees. He soon distinguished himself as one of the most conservative and anticommunist senators, becoming a leading member and spokesperson for the right wing of the Republican Party.

Harmon Killebrew
In the early 1950s, Welker told Washington Senators owner Clark Griffith about Harmon Killebrew, a young baseball player from Payette who was batting .847 for a semi-professional team at the time.  Griffith told his farm director Ossie Bluege about the tip and Bluege flew to Idaho to watch Killebrew play.  The Boston Red Sox also expressed interest but Bluege succeeded in signing Killebrew to a $50,000 contract on June 19, 1954.
Killebrew (1936–2011) had a Hall of Fame career in the major leagues, with 573 home runs.

Association with Joseph McCarthy
In the early 1950s, Welker became closely associated with fellow Republican Senator Joseph McCarthy of Wisconsin and "McCarthyism", so much so that he was often referred to by Senate colleagues as "Little Joe from Idaho." In 1954, Welker was McCarthy's chief defender during censure proceedings in the U.S. Senate against McCarthy for the questionable investigative techniques McCarthy had used in pursuing individuals he accused of being communists, and others he accused of being homosexuals, within the government.  Welker was one of 22 Republicans (out of a total of 46 Republican senators) who voted against the censure of McCarthy in 1954 for these "red scare" communist witch hunts, and his so-called "lavender scare" tactics aimed at homosexuals in government.

Welker, along with Republican Senator Styles Bridges of New Hampshire, was a key collaborator with McCarthy in the blackmail of Democratic Senator Lester C. Hunt of Wyoming and his son, that led to Hunt's suicide in his Senate office on June 19, 1954. Welker threatened Sen. Hunt, a staunch opponent of McCarthy's tactics, that if he did not immediately retire from the Senate and not seek re-election in 1954, Welker would see that his son's arrest for soliciting an undercover policeman was prosecuted and would widely publicize his son's alleged homosexuality. Welker also threatened Inspector Roy Blick of the Morals Division of the Washington Police Department with the loss of his job if he failed to prosecute Hunt Jr. After Hunt's suicide, a Republican, Edward D. Crippa, was appointed by the Republican acting governor of Wyoming, Clifford Joy Rogers, to fill the vacant seat.

Alex Ross in The New Yorker wrote in 2012 of an event "loosely dramatized in the novel and film Advise & Consent [in which] Senator Lester Hunt, of Wyoming, killed himself after ... Welker [and others] ... threatened to expose Hunt's son as a homosexual".

In 1955, Welker would be one of two non-Southern senators to vote against the nomination of John Marshall Harlan II to the Supreme Court, opposing Harlan because he was unsatisfied that Harlan

1956 election
In 1956, Welker ran for a second term in the Senate. Although he won the Republican nomination, again defeating Sanborn, he was decisively defeated by 32-year-old Democrat Frank Church of Boise, a relative of his 1950 opponent; Welker received less than 39 percent of the vote. This increased Democratic control of the Senate and led to much anger within the Republican Party, with Joseph McCarthy even accusing President Dwight Eisenhower of not supporting Welker's reelection campaign enough.

Election results

Death
After leaving the Senate in January 1957, Welker practiced law in Boise and participated in farming. After a few months, however, he became ill, and traveled to Bethesda, Maryland, for medical treatment at the National Institutes of Health. He was admitted on October 16, 1957, where he was diagnosed with a brain tumor. Operations were quickly performed, but Welker died later that month at age 50. McCarthy had died earlier that year in Bethesda (Welker had attended McCarthy's funeral).

Welker's funeral was at Fort Myer and he was interred in Arlington National Cemetery. He married Gladys Taylor Pence in 1930, and they had a daughter, Nancy.

References

Attribution

Further reading
 McDaniel, Rodger. Dying for Joe McCarthy's Sins: The Suicide of Wyoming Senator Lester Hunt (WordsWorth, 2013),

External links

 University of Idaho Library – Herman Welker (1906–1957), Papers 1950–1956
 Herman Welker, Corporal, United States Army Air Corps at ArlingtonCemetery.net, an unofficial website
 
 

1906 births
1957 deaths
People from Weiser, Idaho
Republican Party Idaho state senators
University of Idaho alumni
United States Army Air Forces non-commissioned officers
United States Army Air Forces personnel of World War II
Republican Party United States senators from Idaho
Burials at Arlington National Cemetery
Old Right (United States)
20th-century American politicians
People from Washington County, Idaho
People from Payette, Idaho
University of Idaho College of Law alumni
McCarthyism
20th-century American Episcopalians
Anti-communism in the United States